The 1974 Kentucky Derby was the 100th running of the Kentucky Derby. The race took place on May 4, 1974, with 163,628 people in attendance. The 1974 Kentucky Derby holds the title of the second largest crowd in the history of U.S. Thoroughbred racing.

Full results

References

1974
Kentucky Derby
Derby
Kentucky
Kentucky Derby